The Howard County Department of Corrections (HCDC) is the corrections agency servicing 3500 arrests within  of Howard County, Maryland yearly.

History
Corrections in Howard County was handled through the county police. The first institution built was the twelve person Ellicott City Jail in 1878. In 1975 a separate division was created by County Executive Edward L. Cochran. Its first director was Gerald H. McClellan.

Organization
The department operates the following facilities

Central Booking Center
Housed at Waterloo southern Police barracks. Moved to Jessup facility opened 28 March 2005
Central Detention Facility
Opened in 1983 with a capacity of 108 inmates. In 1994 the facility was expanded to 361 inmates.

In 2009, the department took over operations of the Howard County Community Service Program, subcontracting to the Serenity Center

See also 

 Howard County Police Department
 List of law enforcement agencies in Maryland

References

Police Department
County police departments of Maryland
1975 establishments in Maryland
Prison and correctional agencies in the United States